Eglington Cemetery is a cemetery located in the Clarksboro section of East Greenwich Township, in Gloucester County, New Jersey, United States.

Notable interments
 Robert C. Hendrickson (1898–1964), United States Senator from New Jersey from 1949 to 1955.
 Joshua B. Howell (1806–1864), Civil War general
 Henry C. Loudenslager (1852–1911), represented New Jersey's 1st congressional district from 1893 to 1911.
 James Matlack (1775–1840), United States congressman from New Jersey from 1821–1825.
 Ray Narleski (1928–2012), Major League Baseball player from 1954–1959.

References

External links
 Eglington Cemetery at The Political Graveyard
 

Cemeteries in Gloucester County, New Jersey
East Greenwich Township, New Jersey